N Kai Ra is a Burmese pop singer of Kachin descent. A native of Mogok, she married Mahaw Phone Aung (M Phung Awng) in January 2014.

Discography

References

21st-century Burmese women singers
Living people
Burmese people of Kachin descent
People from Mandalay Region
Year of birth missing (living people)